The 1962 Open Championship was held at the Royal Automobile Club in Pall Mall, London from 27 November - 4 December 1961.
Azam Khan won his fourth consecutive title beating Mo Khan in a repeat of the 1961 final. Roshan Khan defeated Dardir El Bakary in the third place play off 9-6 9-7 8-10 0-9 9-1.

Seeds

Draw and results

Section 1

Section 2

Semi-finals & Final

References

Men's British Open Squash Championships
Men's British Open Championship
Men's British Open Squash Championship
Men's British Open Squash Championship
Men's British Open Squash Championship
Men's British Open Squash Championship
Squash competitions in London